Clément Léon Émile Thomas was Governor General for various colonies in the Second French Colonial Empire, notably that of Senegal from 1888 to 1890 and French India from 1891 to 1896. In 1893 Clément-Thomas was made an honorary Knight Commander of the Indian Empire by the Government of British India.

Titles Held

References

French generals
Governors of French India
People of French West Africa
Colonial Governors of French Sénégal
Colonial Governors of French Madagascar
People of the French Third Republic
Year of birth missing
Year of death missing
French colonial governors and administrators